The Red Krayola is an album by the experimental rock band Red Krayola, released in 1994 by Drag City.

Frontman Mayo Thompson had been living in Germany prior to the recording of the album. He was lured back into the studio by younger musicians who considered him an influence.

Critical reception
The Chicago Reader praised the album, writing: "It's the band's most blatant 'rock' outing, but among the barbed guitar riffs, weird synth gurgles, and solid rhythmic underpinnings is Thompson's usual caustic humor, this time ripping apart the sacred cows of rock and pop."

Track listing

Personnel 

Red Krayola
David Grubbs
John McEntire
Albert Oehlen
Jim O'Rourke
Stephen Prina
Mayo Thompson
Tom Watson

Additional musicians and production
Steve Albini – engineering
Brian Paulson – engineering
Bob Weston – engineering

References

External links 
 

1994 albums
Drag City (record label) albums
Red Krayola albums